 
Tambor is a coastal Afro-Venezuelan music and dance. It is a cultural manifestation originating in the slaves from Africa.   

The main public ritual of the African diasporic religion, Santería,  the toque de santo drumming ceremony, is also known as tambor.

Groups
Tambor Urbano
Un Solo Pueblo
Grupo Madera

References

 
 

Afro–Latin American culture
Afro-Venezuelan
Venezuelan music